John or Johnny Love may refer to:

Law and politics
 John Lord Love (1841–1899), California politician
 John Arthur Love (1916–2002), Colorado governor
 John Russell Love (1895–1981), Alberta politician
 John Love (judge), magistrate judge, United States District Court for the Eastern District of Texas
 John Love (congressman) (died 1822), American politician and lawyer from Virginia

Sports
 John Love (footballer) (1924–2007), Scottish football player and manager
 Johnny Love (footballer) (1937–2010), former English footballer
 John Love (American football) (born 1944), American football wide receiver 
 John Love (racing driver) (1924–2005), Rhodesian racing driver

Others
 John Love (minister) (1757–1825), Church of Scotland minister
 John Love (scientist) (1942–2016), pioneer of fibre optics
 John Love (general) (1820–1881), United States Army officer
 John Washington Love (1850–1880), artist; see William Forsyth
 Alain Payet (1947–2007), French director under the pseudonym John Love
 David Love (geologist) (John David Love, 1913–2002), American geologist
 John K. Love, United States Marine Corps general